Delias iltis is a butterfly in the family Pieridae. It was described by Carl Ribbe in 1900. It is endemic to New Guinea.

The wingspan is about 60–64 mm. The forewings of the males have a white area extended to beyond the end of the cell, its edge sharply defined, angled in cellule 4, incurved from the angle to vein 3, excurved to vein 2 and curved inwards to the inner margin close to the tornus. The costa is black to the base and connected with a black discocellular bar. There are two white subapical dots in the black distal area. The hindwings have a narrow black marginal border, sometimes reduced to a mere line. The forewings of the females have more extended black which form a broad bar on the discocellulars which is sometimes only defined by a narrow and obscure white prolongation beyond the cell. There are three or four small white subapical spots. The hindwings have a much wider black border than in males, containing five white spots of moderate size.

Subspecies
Delias iltis iltis (southern Highlands & Owen Stanley Range, Papua New Guinea)
Delias iltis leucotera Talbot, 1937 (Herzog Mtns, Papua New Guinea)
Delias iltis majai Yagishita, 1993 (Ilu-Mulia, Irian Jaya)
Delias iltis sibil van Mastrigt, 1995 (Abmisibil, Irian Jaya & north-east of Tabubil, Papua New Guinea)

References

External links
Delias at Markku Savela's Lepidoptera and Some Other Life Forms

iltis
Butterflies described in 1900
Endemic fauna of New Guinea